The West Down by-election to the Westminster parliament was held on 5 July 1921.  The by-election was held due to the appointment as Recorder of Belfast of the incumbent UUP MP, Daniel Martin Wilson.  The UUP candidate Thomas Browne Wallace was elected unopposed.

References

West Down
West Down 1921
West Down 1921
West Down election
West Down